Ridgewood is a community comprising three neighbourhoods within the east-central portion of Mill Woods in the City of Edmonton, Alberta, Canada. Neighbourhoods within the community include Bisset, Minchau and Weinlos.

The community is represented by the Ridgewood Community League, established in 1982, which maintains a community hall and outdoor rink located at Mill Woods Road East and 37 Avenue.

See also 
 Edmonton Federation of Community Leagues

References

External links 
Ridgewood Community League

Neighbourhoods in Edmonton